Tori is a municipality located in Pärnu County, one of the 15 counties of Estonia.

Settlements
Towns
Sindi
 
Small boroughs
Are, Tori, Sauga
 
Villages
Aesoo - Eametsa - Eavere - Elbi - Elbu - Jõesuu - Kiisa - Kildemaa - Kilksama - Kõrsa - Kuiaru - Kurena - Lepplaane - Levi - Mannare - Muraka - Murru - Muti - Niidu - Nurme - Oore - Parisselja - Pärivere - Piistaoja - Pulli - Räägu - Randivälja - Rätsepa - Rütavere - Riisa - Selja - Suigu - Taali - Tabria - Tammiste - Tohera - Urge - Urumarja - Vainu - Võlla - Võlli

Religion

References 

 
Municipalities of Estonia